Hydrogen pipeline transport is a transportation of hydrogen through a pipe as part of the hydrogen infrastructure.

History
1938 – Rhine-Ruhr The first  hydrogen pipes that are constructed of regular pipe steel, compressed hydrogen pressure , diameter . Still in operation.
1973 –  pipeline in Isbergues, France.
1985 – Extension of the pipeline from Isbergues to Zeebrugge
1997 – Connection of the pipeline to Rotterdam
1997 – 2000: Development of two hydrogen networks, one near Corpus Christi, Texas, and one between Freeport and Texas City.
2009 –  extension of the pipeline from Plaquemine to Chalmette.

Economics

Hydrogen pipeline transport is used to transport hydrogen from the point of production or delivery to the point of demand. Although hydrogen pipeline transport is technologically mature, and the transport costs are similar to those of CNG, most hydrogen is produced in the place of demand, with an industrial production facility every

Piping
This is because higher hardnesses are associated with lower fracture toughness so stronger, higher hardness steel is less safe.

Composite pipes are assessed like:
carbon fiber structure with fiberglass overlay  .
perfluoroalkoxy (PFA, MFA).
polytetrafluoroethylene (PTFE)
fluorinated ethylene propylene (FEP) .
carbon-fiber-reinforced polymers (FRP)

Fiber-Reinforced Polymer pipelines (or FRP pipeline) and reinforced thermoplastic pipes are researched.

Carrying hydrogen in steel pipelines (grades: API5L-X42 and X52; up to 1,000psi/7,000kPa, constant pressure/low pressure cycling) does not lead to hydrogen embrittlement. Hydrogen is typically stored in steel cylinders without problems.
Coal gas (also known as town gas) is 50% hydrogen and was carried in cast-iron pipes for half a century without any embrittlement issues.

Infrastructure

2004 - USA -  of low pressure hydrogen pipelines
2004 - Europe -  of low pressure hydrogen pipelines.

Gallery

See also
Guided rotor compressor
HCNG
Hydrogen economy
Hydrogen infrastructure
Hydrogen leak testing
Hydrogen station
Hydrogen turboexpander-generator
Pipeline transport
Plastic pressure pipe systems
Timeline of hydrogen technologies
Tubing (material)

References

External links
Hydrogen Transport by Pipeline
Idaho national laboratory
Composite
(ASME B31.12)
Hydrogen Embrittlement group

Pipeline transport
Piping
Hydrogen infrastructure
Hydrogen technologies
Industrial gases